Mike Havekotte (born 12 September 1995) is a Dutch professional footballer who plays as a goalkeeper for Helmond Sport in the Eerste Divisie.

Club career

ADO Den Haag
Havekotte joined ADO Den Haag on 6 July 2018, after stints as the backup goalkeeper at FC Utrecht and Excelsior. Havekotte made his professional debut with ADO Den Haag in a 4–2 loss to VVV-Venlo on 19 January 2019. In the second half of the 2019–20 season, he was sent on loan to FC Dordrecht and in September 2020, Havekotte joined MVV Maastricht on a one-season loan.

Helmond Sport
On 30 July 2021, Havekotte signed a two-year contract with an option for an additional year with Helmond Sport. Prior, he had been the starting goalkeeper during his two loan spells with Dordrecht and MVV, respectively. He made his debut for Helmond Sport on 6 August in a 0–2 loss to FC Den Bosch. On 27 August, he held his first clean sheet in a 1–0 win over Jong PSV.

International career
Havekotte was part of the Netherlands U17 who won the 2012 UEFA European Under-17 Championship, but did not make an appearance. Havekotte was a youth international for the Netherlands U18s and Netherlands U19.

Water polo
Havekotte is the son of Robert Havekotte, a Dutch former water polo player. Mike played water polo himself at BZC Brandenburg as a youth, alongside football. He represented a Dutch youth team in water polo, winning a tournament in Ukraine in 2010. Havekotte had to choose between football and water polo, and opted to remain in football because of the greater potential in the sport.

Career statistics

Honours
Netherlands U17
 UEFA European Under-17 Championship: 2012

References

External links

Living people
1995 births
People from De Bilt
Footballers from Utrecht (province)
Dutch footballers
Netherlands youth international footballers
Dutch male water polo players
Excelsior Rotterdam players
ADO Den Haag players
FC Dordrecht players
MVV Maastricht players
Helmond Sport players
Eredivisie players
Eerste Divisie players
Association football goalkeepers